Leucanopsis nubilosus is a moth of the family Erebidae. It was described by Walter Rothschild in 1909. It is found in Peru and Bolivia.

References

nubilosus
Moths described in 1909